Burn for You may refer to:
"Burn for You" (INXS song), 1984
"Burn for You" (John Farnham song), 1990
"Burn for You" (TobyMac song), 2004

See also
Burning for You, a 1977 album by Strawbs
"Burnin' for You", a 1981 song by Blue Öyster Cult